Fourcès is a commune in the Gers department in the Occitanie region in southwestern France known for its circular square.

Geography
Fourcès lies near Castelnau-d'Auzan and Montréal.

The Auzoue flows north through the middle of the commune. The village lies in the middle of the commune, on the left bank of the Auzoue.

Population

Sights
Fourcès is a typical medieval bastide, a little village where the houses are built in a circle to allow a proper defence.

The following are notable sights:
 The arena for the course Landaise for example in Castelnau-d'Auzan.
 Old Armagnac caves.
 The bastide of Bretagne-d'Armagnac.
 The Bastide Gasconne of Fourcès.
 The city of  Montréal-du-Gers with a medieval bastide.
 The city of Eauze and its Roman treasure.
 The fortified village of Larressingle.
 The Gallo-Roman villa of Séviac, in Montréal-du-Gers.
 The Ganaderia de Buros.
 The museum of D'Artagnan in Lupiac.
 The Spa of Barbotan-les-Thermes in Cazaubon.

See also
Communes of the Gers department

References

External links

More statistical information concerning the commune on www.insee.fr

Communes of Gers
Plus Beaux Villages de France